Lucky Days, also known as I Love You in the Second Round, is a 2010 Taiwanese television series starring Tammy Chen and Chris Wang  which first premiered on  January 8, 2010 on TTV and SETTV.

Synopsis
The only reason money-grabbing magazine editor Chen Miao Ru and unambitious working man Ren Xiao Guo got married was because of money. Miao Ru got caught in a financial bind due flipping houses. Pooling their resources was the only to prevent a financial crisis of her own. However, married life was nothing like their peaceful dating life. Soon, they were on the verge of divorce. Yet, Ren doesn't to divorce. A mysterious computer with a program in the county clerk's bathroom allowing him to time travel to his past and make changes.

Cast

Main
Tammy Chen as Chen Miao-ju 
Chris Wang as Jen Hsiao-kuo

Supporting
Fan Kuan-yao as Huang Yung-yuan 
A Hsi as Chen Kun-shan 
Lin Mei-hsiu as Lin Mei-man
Ma Nien-hsien as Tsai Yu-min 
Chiang Li-li as Mrs. Huang 
Tu Tai-Feng as Ke Ai 
Kuan Yung as Jen's Dad 
Ying Tsai-ling as Jen's Mom 
Lin Wei-lias Jen Hsiao-chieh 
Mario as Hsu Mao-heng 
Yvonne Yao as Ms. Chi 
Hu Ying-chen as Fang Yen-hsiu 
Ke Shu-yuan as Mr. Hsiao 
Jessica Song as Chen Hsin-ju 
Wang Chien-min as Abra Yu 
Chen Yu-fang as Chiu Shu-chuan 
Peggy Fu as Mimi

Publications

References

External links
TTV Official Website 
SETTV Official Blog 

Taiwan Television original programming
Sanlih E-Television original programming
2010 Taiwanese television series debuts
2010 Taiwanese television series endings
Television shows written by Mag Hsu